Sideroxylon foetidissimum, commonly known as false mastic or yellow mastic, is a species of flowering plant in the family Sapotaceae.  It is native to Florida in the United States, the Caribbean, and northern Central America.

References

External links

foetidissimum
Plants described in 1760
Taxa named by Nikolaus Joseph von Jacquin
Trees of Mexico
Trees of the Southeastern United States
Trees of the Caribbean
Trees of Central America
Flora without expected TNC conservation status